A foreign national wishing to enter Morocco must obtain a visa unless they are a citizen of one of the countries eligible for visa exemption. On July 10, 2022, The Moroccan government has launched an     e-Visa system to facilitate the granting of visas to foreign nationals subject to this formality.

Visa policy map

Visa free access 

Nationals of the following 72 countries and territories can enter Morocco visa-free for up to 90 days (unless otherwise noted):

1 - for holders of British passports, only British citizens, British Nationals (Overseas) and British subjects with a Certificate of Entitlement to the Right of Abode issued by the UK are eligible for visa-free entry.

Electronic Travel Authorization 
Citizens of the following 3 countries do not require a visa but must obtain an Electronic Travel Authorization in advance to enter Morocco.

eVisa
Nationals of the following countries and territories holding ordinary passports may apply for an electronic visa (e-Visa) online:

Third-country visas or residence documents
Nationals of most countries and territories that are not visa exempt may apply for an eVisa if they hold a valid visa or permanent residency documents issued by any of the following countries:

This is not applicable to nationals of the following countries and territories:

Diplomatic and official/service passports
Holders of passports issued by the following countries are allowed to enter and remain in Morocco for up to 90 days.

D — diplomatic passports
S — service passports
Sp — special passports
O — official passports

Visa not required for holders of passport of United Nations (laissez passer) traveling on duty.

Visa waiver agreement for diplomatic passports was signed with Angola and it is yet to come into force.

See also 

Visa requirements for Moroccan citizens

References

External links
List of countries whose nationals are exempt from entry visa to Morocco (English)
List of countries whose nationals are exempt from entry visa to Morocco (Spanish)
List of countries whose nationals are exempt from entry visa to Morocco (French)
List of Agreements signed by Morocco on the abolition of visas for official passports (French)
Electronic Travel Authorization of Morocco (French)

Morocco